The One Ring, also called the Ruling Ring and Isildur's Bane, is a central plot element in J. R. R. Tolkien's The Lord of the Rings (1954–55). It first appeared in the earlier story The Hobbit (1937) as a magic ring that grants the wearer invisibility. Tolkien changed it into a malevolent Ring of Power and re-wrote parts of The Hobbit to fit in with the expanded narrative. The Lord of the Rings describes the hobbit Frodo Baggins's quest to destroy the Ring.

Critics have compared the story with the ring-based plot of Richard Wagner's opera cycle Der Ring des Nibelungen; Tolkien denied any connection, but at the least, both men drew on the same mythology. Another source is Tolkien's analysis of Nodens, an obscure pagan god with a temple at Lydney Park, where he studied the Latin inscriptions, one containing a curse on the thief of a ring.

Tolkien rejected the idea that the story was an allegory, saying that applicability to situations such as the Second World War and the atomic bomb was a matter for readers. Other parallels have been drawn with the Ring of Gyges in Plato's  Republic, which conferred invisibility, though there is no suggestion that Tolkien borrowed from the story.

Fictional description

Purpose 
The One Ring was forged by the Dark Lord Sauron during the Second Age to gain dominion over the free peoples of Middle-earth. In disguise as Annatar, or "Lord of Gifts", he aided the Elven smiths of Eregion and their leader Celebrimbor in the making of the Rings of Power. He then forged the One Ring in the fires of Mount Doom.

Sauron intended it to be the most powerful of all Rings, able to rule and control those who wore the others. Since the other Rings were powerful on their own, Sauron was obliged to place much of his own power into the One to achieve his purpose.

Creating the Ring simultaneously strengthened and weakened Sauron. With the Ring, he could control the power of all the other Rings, and thus he was significantly more powerful after its creation than before; but by binding his power within the Ring, Sauron became dependent on it.

Appearance

The Ring seemed to be made simply of gold, but it was completely impervious to damage, even to dragon fire (unlike other rings). It could be destroyed only by throwing it into the pit of the volcanic Mount Doom where it had been forged. Like some lesser rings, but unlike the other Rings of Power, it bore no gem. It could change size, and perhaps its weight, and could suddenly expand to escape from its wearer. Its identity could be determined by placing it in a fire, when it displayed a fiery inscription in the Black Speech that Sauron had devised. This was written in the Elvish Tengwar script, with two lines in the Black Speech from the rhyme of lore describing the Rings:
 

When Isildur cut the Ring from Sauron's hand, it was burning hot, its inscription legible; he transcribed it before it faded. Gandalf learned of the secret inscription from Isildur's account, and heated Frodo's ring to reveal it, proving it to be the One Ring. Gandalf recited the inscription in Black Speech at the Council of Elrond, causing everyone to tremble:

Internal history

After forging the ring, Sauron waged war on the Elves. He destroyed Eregion and killed Celebrimbor, the maker of the three Elf-rings. King Tar-Minastir of Númenor sent a great fleet to Middle-earth, and with this aid Gil-galad destroyed Sauron's army and forced Sauron to return to Mordor.

Later, Ar-Pharazôn, the last and most powerful king of Númenor, landed at Umbar with an immense army, forcing Sauron's armies to flee. Sauron was taken to Númenor as a prisoner. Tolkien wrote in a 1958 letter that the surrender was both "voluntary and cunning" so he could gain access to Númenor. Sauron used the Númenóreans' fear of death to turn them against the Valar, and manipulate them into worshipping his master, Morgoth, with human sacrifice.

Sauron's body was destroyed in the Fall of Númenor, but his spirit travelled back to Middle-earth and wielded the One Ring in renewed war against the Last Alliance of Elves and Men. Tolkien wrote, "I do not think one need boggle at this spirit carrying off the One Ring, upon which his power of dominating minds now largely depended."

Gil-galad and Elendil destroyed Sauron's physical form at the end of the Last Alliance, at the cost of their own lives. Elendil's son, Isildur, cut the Ring from Sauron's hand on the slopes of Mount Doom. Though counselled to destroy the Ring, he was swayed by its power and kept it "as weregild for my father, and my brother". A few years later, Isildur was ambushed by Orcs by the River Anduin near the Gladden Fields; he put on the Ring to escape, but it chose to slip from his finger as he swam, and, suddenly visible, he was killed by the Orcs. Since the Ring indirectly caused Isildur's death, it was known in Gondorian lore as "Isildur's Bane".

The Ring remained hidden on the river bed for almost two and a half millennia, until it was discovered on a fishing trip by a Stoor hobbit named Déagol. His friend and relative Sméagol, who had gone fishing with him, was immediately ensnared by the Ring's power and demanded that Déagol give it to him as a "birthday present"; when Déagol refused, Sméagol strangled him and took the Ring. It corrupted his body and mind, turning him into the monstrous Gollum. The Ring manipulated Gollum into hiding in a cave under the Misty Mountains near Mirkwood, where Sauron was beginning to resurface. There Gollum remained for nearly 500 years, using the Ring to hunt Orcs. The Ring eventually abandoned Gollum, knowing it would never leave the cave whilst he bore it.

As told in The Hobbit, Bilbo found the Ring while lost in the tunnels near Gollum's lair. In the first edition, Gollum offers to surrender the Ring to Bilbo as a reward for winning the Riddle Game. When Tolkien was writing The Lord of the Rings, he realized that the Ring's grip on Gollum would never permit him to give it up willingly. He therefore revised The Hobbit: in the second edition, after losing the Riddle Game to Bilbo, Gollum went to get his "Precious" to help him kill and eat Bilbo, but found the Ring missing. Deducing from Bilbo's last question—"What have I got in my pocket?"—that Bilbo had found the Ring, Gollum chased him through the caves, not realizing that Bilbo had discovered the Ring's power of invisibility and was following him to the cave's mouth. Bilbo escaped Gollum and the goblins by remaining invisible, but he chose not to tell Gandalf and the dwarves that the Ring had made him invisible. Instead he told them a story that followed the first edition: that Gollum had given him the Ring and shown him the way out. Gandalf was immediately suspicious of the Ring, and later forced the real story from Bilbo.

Gollum eventually left the Misty Mountains to track down the Ring. He was drawn to Mordor, where he was captured. Sauron tortured and interrogated him, learning that the Ring had been found and was held by one "Baggins" in the land of "Shire".

The Ring began to strain Bilbo, leaving him feeling "stretched-out and thin", so he decided to leave the Shire, intending to pass the Ring to his adopted heir Frodo Baggins. He briefly gave in to the Ring's power, even calling it "my precious"; alarmed, Gandalf spoke harshly to his old friend to persuade him to give it up, which Bilbo did, becoming the first Ring-bearer to surrender it willingly.

By this time Sauron had regained much of his power, and the Dark Tower in Mordor had been rebuilt. Gollum, released from Mordor, was captured by Aragorn. Gandalf learned from Gollum that Sauron now knew where to find the Ring. To prevent Sauron from reclaiming his Ring, Frodo and eight other companions set out from Rivendell for Mordor to destroy the Ring in the fires of Mount Doom. During the quest, Frodo gradually fell under the Ring's power. When he and his faithful servant Sam Gamgee discovered Gollum on their trail and "tamed" him into guiding them to Mordor, Frodo began to feel a bond with the wretched, treacherous creature, while Gollum warmed to Frodo's kindness and made an effort to keep his promise. Gollum however gave in to the Ring's temptation, and betrayed Frodo to the spider Shelob. Believing Frodo to be dead, Sam bore the Ring himself for a short time and experienced the temptation it induced.

Sam rescued Frodo from Orcs at the Tower of Cirith Ungol. The hobbits, followed by Gollum, reached Mount Doom, where Frodo was overcome by the Ring's power and claimed it for himself. At that moment, Gollum bit off his finger, taking back the Ring, but, gloating, he and the Ring fell into the fires of Mount Doom. The Ring and Sauron's power were destroyed.

Powers
The Ring's primary power was control of the other Rings of Power and domination of the wills of their users. The Ring also conferred power to dominate the wills of other beings whether they were wearing Rings or not—but only in proportion to the user's native capacity. In the same way, it amplified any inherent power its owner possessed.

A mortal wearing the Ring became effectively invisible except to those able to perceive the non-physical world, with only a thin, shaky shadow discernible in the brightest sunlight. All the same, when Sam wore the ring on the edge of Mordor, "he did not feel invisible at all, but horribly and uniquely visible; and he knew that somewhere an Eye was searching for him". Sam was able to understand the Black Speech of Orcs in Mordor during his brief possession of the One Ring.

The Ring extended the life of a mortal possessor indefinitely, preventing natural aging. Gandalf explained that it did not grant new life, but that the possessor merely continued until life became unbearably wearisome. The Ring did not protect its bearer from destruction; Gollum perished in the Crack of Doom, and Sauron's body was destroyed in the downfall of Númenor. Like the Nine Rings, the One Ring physically corrupted mortals who wore it, eventually transforming them into wraiths. Hobbits were more resistant to this than Men: Gollum, who possessed the ring for 500 years, did not become wraith-like because he rarely wore the Ring. 
Except for Tom Bombadil, nobody seemed to be immune to the corrupting effects of the One Ring, even powerful beings like Gandalf and Galadriel, who refused to wield it out of the knowledge that they would become like Sauron himself.

Within the land of Mordor where it was forged, the Ring's power increased so significantly that even without wearing it the bearer could draw upon it, and could acquire an aura of terrible power. When Sam encountered an Orc in the Tower of Cirith Ungol while holding the Ring, he appeared to the terrified Orc as a powerful warrior cloaked in shadow "[holding] some nameless menace of power and doom". Similarly at Mount Doom, when Frodo and Sam were attacked by Gollum, Frodo grabbed the Ring and appeared as "a figure robed in white... [that] held a wheel of fire". Frodo told Gollum "in a commanding voice" that "If you touch me ever again, you shall be cast yourself into the Fire of Doom", a prophecy soon fulfilled.

As the Ring contained much of Sauron's power, it was endowed with a malevolent agency. While separated from Sauron, the Ring strove to return to him by manipulating its bearer to claim ownership of it, or by abandoning its bearer.

To master the Ring's capabilities, a Ring bearer would need a well-trained mind, a strong will, and great native power. Those with weaker minds, such as hobbits and lesser Men, would gain little from the Ring, let alone realize its full potential. Even for one with the necessary strength, it would have taken time to master the Ring's power sufficiently to overthrow Sauron.

The Ring did not render its bearer omnipotent. Three times Sauron suffered military defeat while bearing the Ring, first by Gil-galad in the War of Sauron and the Elves, then by Ar-Pharazôn when Númenórean power so overawed his armies that they deserted him, and at the end of the Second Age with his personal defeat by Gil-galad and Elendil. Tolkien indicates in a speech by Elrond that such a defeat would not have been possible in the waning years of the Third Age, when the strength of the free peoples was greatly diminished. There were no remaining heroes of the stature of Gil-galad, Elendil, or Isildur; the strength of the Elves was fading and they were departing to the Blessed Realm; and the Númenórean kingdoms had either declined or been destroyed, and had few allies.

Fate of the Ring-bearers

Of the Ring-bearers, three were alive after the Ring's destruction, the hobbits Bilbo, Frodo, and Sam. Bilbo, having borne the Ring the longest, had his life much prolonged. Frodo was scarred physically and mentally by his quest. Sam, having only briefly kept the Ring, was affected the least. In consideration of the trials Bilbo and Frodo faced, the Valar allowed them to travel to the Undying Lands, accompanying Galadriel, Elrond, and  Gandalf. Sam is also said to have been taken to the Undying Lands, after living in the Shire for many years and raising a large family. Tolkien emphasized that the restorative sojourn of the Ring-bearers in the Undying Lands would not have been permanent. As mortals, they would eventually die and leave the world of Eä.

Analysis

Norse mythology and Wagner

Tolkien's use of the Ring was influenced by Norse mythology. While at King Edward's School in Birmingham, he read and translated from the Old Norse in his free time. One of his first Norse purchases was the Völsunga saga. While a student, he read the only available English translation, the 1870 rendering by William Morris of the Victorian Arts and Crafts movement and Icelandic scholar Eiríkur Magnússon. That saga and the Middle High German Nibelungenlied were coeval texts that used the same ancient sources. Both of them provided some of the basis for Richard Wagner's opera series, Der Ring des Nibelungen, featuring in particular a magical but cursed golden ring and a broken sword reforged. In the Völsunga saga, these items are respectively Andvaranaut and Gram, and they correspond broadly to the One Ring and the sword Narsil (reforged as Andúril).

Tolkien dismissed critics' direct comparisons to Wagner, telling his publisher, "Both rings were round, and there the resemblance ceases." Some critics hold that Tolkien's work borrows so liberally from Wagner that it exists in the shadow of Wagner's. Others, such as Gloriana St. Clair, attribute the resemblances to the fact that Tolkien and Wagner had created works based on the same sources in Norse mythology. Tom Shippey and other researchers hold an intermediary position, stating that the authors indeed used the same source materials, but that Tolkien was indebted to some of the original developments, insights and artistic uses of those sources that first appeared in Wagner, and sought to improve upon them.

Nodens

In 1928, a 4th-century pagan mystery cult temple was excavated at Lydney Park, Gloucestershire. Tolkien was asked to investigate a Latin inscription there, which mentioned the theft of a ring, with a curse upon its thief:

The Anglo-Saxon name for the place was Dwarf's Hill, and in 1932 Tolkien traced Nodens to the Irish hero Nuada Airgetlám, "Nuada of the Silver-Hand". Shippey thought this "a pivotal influence" on Tolkien's Middle-earth, combining as it did a god-hero, a ring, dwarves, and a silver hand. The J. R. R. Tolkien Encyclopedia notes the "Hobbit-like appearance of [Dwarf's Hill]'s mine-shaft holes", and that Tolkien was extremely interested in the hill's folklore on his stay there; it cites Helen Armstrong's comment that the place may have inspired Tolkien's "Celebrimbor and the fallen realms of Moria and Eregion". The scholar of English literature John M. Bowers writes that the name of the Elven-smith Celebrimbor, who forged the Elf-rings, is the Sindarin for "Silver Hand".

Applicability not allegory

Tolkien stated that The Lord of the Rings was not a point-by-point allegory, particularly not of political events of his time such as the Second World War. At the same time he contrasted "applicability", which he described as "within the "freedom of the reader", and "allegory" as "the purposed domination of the author". He stated that had the Second World War "inspired or directed the development of the legend" as an allegory, then the fate of the Ring, and of Middle-earth, would have been very different:

Anne C. Petty, writing in The J. R. R. Tolkien Encyclopedia, notes that Tolkien was all the same quite capable of using "allegorical elements when it suited his purpose", and that he agreed that the approach of war in 1938 "had had some effect on it": The Lord of the Rings was applicable to the horror of war in general, as long as it was not taken as a point-by-point allegory of any particular war, with false equations like "Sauron=Satan or Hitler or Stalin, Gandalf=God or Churchill, Aragorn=Christ or MacArthur, the Ring=the atomic bomb, Mordor=Hell or Russia or Germany".

One aspect of such applicability, which the Tolkien scholar Tom Shippey notes is rarely picked up by readers, is that Tolkien chose dates of symbolic importance in Christianity for the quest to destroy the Ring. It began in Rivendell on 25 December, the date of Christmas, and ended on Mount Doom on 25 March, a traditional Anglo-Saxon date for the crucifixion.

Parallels with Plato's Republic

A source that Tolkien "might have borrowed" from, though there is no evidence for this, is Plato's Republic. Its second book tells the story of the Ring of Gyges that gave its owner the power of invisibility. In so doing, it created a moral dilemma, enabling people to commit injustices without fearing they would be caught. In contrast, Tolkien's Ring actively exerts an evil force that destroys the morality of the wearer.

The scholar of humanities Frederick A. de Armas notes parallels between Plato's and Tolkien's rings, and suggests that both Bilbo and Gyges, going into deep dark places to find hidden treasure, may have "undergone a Catabasis", a psychological journey to the Underworld.

The Tolkien scholar Eric Katz, without suggesting that Tolkien was aware of the Ring of Gyges, writes that "Plato argues that such [moral] corruption will occur, but Tolkien shows us this corruption through the thoughts and actions of his characters". In Katz's view, Plato tries to counter the "cynical conclusion" that moral life is chosen by the weak; Glaucon thinks that people are only "good" because they suppose they will be caught if they are not. Plato argues that immoral life is no good as it corrupts one's soul. So, Katz states, according to Plato a moral person has peace and happiness, and would not use a Ring of Power. In Katz's view, Tolkien's story "demonstrate[s] various responses to the question posed by Plato: would a just person be corrupted by the possibility of almost unlimited power?" The question is answered in different ways: Gollum is weak, quickly corrupted, and finally destroyed; Boromir begins virtuous but like Plato's Gyges is corrupted "by the temptation of power" from the Ring, even if he wants to use it for good, but redeems himself by defending the hobbits to his own death; the "strong and virtuous" Galadriel, who sees clearly what she would become if she accepted the ring, and rejects it; the immortal Tom Bombadil, exempt from the Ring's corrupting power and from its gift of invisibility; Sam who in a moment of need faithfully uses the ring, but is not seduced by its vision of "Samwise the Strong, Hero of the Age"; and finally Frodo who is gradually corrupted, but is saved by his earlier mercy to Gollum, and Gollum's desperation for the Ring. Katz concludes that Tolkien's answer to Plato's "Why be moral?" is "to be yourself".

Object of the quest 

The scholar of the humanities Brian Rosebury noted that The Lord of the Rings combines a slow, descriptive series of scenes or tableaux illustrating Middle-earth with a unifying plotline in the shape of the quest to destroy the Ring. The Ring needs to be destroyed to save Middle-earth itself from destruction or domination by Sauron. The work builds up Middle-earth as a place that readers come to love, shows that it is under dire threat, and – with the destruction of the Ring – provides the "eucatastrophe" for a happy ending. The work is thus, Rosebury asserted, very tightly constructed, the expansive descriptions and the Ring-based plot fitting together exactly.

Addiction to power 

The Ring offers power to its wearer, and progressively corrupts the wearer's mind to evil. The Tolkien scholar Tom Shippey applies Lord Acton's 1887 statement that "Power tends to corrupt, and absolute power corrupts absolutely. Great men are almost always bad men" to it. He notes that the opinion is distinctively modern, and that other modern authors such as George Orwell with Animal Farm (1945), William Golding with Lord of the Flies (1954), and T. H. White with The Once and Future King (1958) similarly wrote about the corrupting effects of power. When the critic Colin Manlove described Tolkien's attitude to power as inconsistent, arguing that the supposedly overwhelming Ring was handed over easily enough by Sam and Bilbo, and had little effect on Aragorn, Legolas, and Gimli, Shippey replies in "one word" that the explanation is simple: the Ring is addictive, increasing in effect with exposure. Other scholars concur about its addictive nature.

Adaptations

In the 1981 BBC Radio serial of The Lord of the Rings, the Nazgûl chant the Ring-inscription; the BBC Radiophonic Workshop's sound effects for the Nazgul and the Black Speech of Mordor have been described as "nightmarish".

In Peter Jackson's The Lord of the Rings film trilogy, the wearer of the Ring is portrayed as moving through a shadowy realm where everything is distorted. The effects of the Ring on Bilbo and Frodo are obsessions that have been compared with drug addiction; the actor Andy Serkis, who played Gollum, cited drug addiction as an inspiration for his performance. The actual ring for the films was designed and created by Jens Hansen Gold & Silversmith in Nelson, New Zealand, and was based on a simple wedding ring. Polygon highlighted that "the workshop produced approximately 40 different rings for the films. Most expensive were the 18 carat solid gold 'hero' rings, sized ten for Frodo’s hand and 11 for the chain. [...] To save money — though not time — the workshop used gold-plated sterling silver for most of the rings. [...] For many fans, the ring used in close-ups — like the scene where the Ring slips away from Frodo to lure Boromir in the snow at Caradhras, or when arguing participants in the Council of Elrond are shown reflected in the Ring’s surface — is the real hero ring. In order to capture the ring’s sheen in high definition, that prop was a full eight inches wide — too big even for Hansen’s tools. Instead, a local machine shop made and polished the shape that Hansen’s team then plated".

A tabletop roleplaying game set in Middle-earth and called "The One Ring" was manufactured by Cubicle 7; a new edition is planned by a partnership of Sophisticated Games and Free League Publishing from 2020.

References

Primary 
This list identifies each item's location in Tolkien's writings.

Secondary

Sources 

 
  
 
 
 
 
  
 
 
 
 
 

Fictional elements introduced in 1937
Magic rings
Middle-earth rings and jewels

de:Gegenstände in Tolkiens Welt#Der Eine Ring